Ariel Behar and Andrey Golubev were the defending champions but only Behar chose to defend his title, partnering Aliaksandr Bury. Behar lost in the quarterfinals to Victor Vlad Cornea and Zdeněk Kolář.

Mateusz Kowalczyk and Andreas Mies won the title after defeating Luca Margaroli and Tristan-Samuel Weissborn 6–3, 7–6(7–3) in the final.

Seeds

Draw

References
 Main Draw

Poprad-Tatry ATP Challenger Tour - Doubles
2017 Doubles